Ingrid Neel (born June 16, 1998) is an American tennis player.
She has won one doubles title on the WTA Tour with two singles and eleven doubles titles on the ITF Circuit. On 8 June 2015, she achieved a career-high singles ranking of world No. 501. On 7 March 2022, she peaked at No. 77 in the WTA doubles rankings.

Personal life
Her grandmother is Estonian, who emigrated during World War II from Saaremaa to United States.

In 2017, tennisrecruiting.net ranked her the #1 incoming college freshman in the United States. Ingrid attended University of Florida in 2018. As the sole freshman on the #1-ranked NCAA Division I Florida Gators women's tennis team, she clinched championship-winning matches for team victories in the finals of Indoor Nationals vs. University of North Carolina and the finals of the NCAA National Championships vs. Stanford  University in 2018.

Tennis career
By winning the Junior National Doubles Championships in 2015, the United States Tennis Association awarded Neel a wildcard into the women's doubles tournament of the 2015 US Open alongside Tornado Alicia Black where the duo won round one. They were unable to accept the substantial prize money since, at the time, it would have rendered them ineligible for participation in college tennis competition.

In April 2021, she won her first career WTA title at the 2021 Copa Colsanitas in Bogota, partnering with French player Elixane Lechemia defeating the third seeded pair of Buzarnescu/Friedsam.

In July of 2022 at the Championships of Wimbledon with partner Alyona Bolsova of Spain, Neel defeated multiple Grand Slam singles and doubles titleist Samantha Stosur and partner Chan, in round one.

Grand Slam performance timeline

Doubles

WTA career finals

Doubles: 1 (title)

ITF finals

Singles: 2 (2 titles)

Doubles: 15 (11 titles, 4 runner–ups)

References

External links
 
 

1998 births
Living people
American female tennis players
People from Oyster Bay (town), New York
American people of Estonian descent
Sportspeople from Bradenton, Florida
Tennis people from New York (state)
21st-century American women
Florida Gators women's tennis players